{{Infobox person
| name               = Rochelle Humes
| image              = Rochelle Humes 2014.jpg
| caption            = Humes in 2014
| imagesize          = 200px
| birth_name         = Rochelle Eulah Eileen Wiseman
| birth_date         = 
| birth_place        = Barking, London, England
| occupation         = 
| spouse             = 
| children           = 3
| television         = Sweat the Small StuffThis MorningChildren in NeedNinja Warrior UKThe Xtra FactorThe Hit List
| education          = Coopers' Company and Coborn School
| relatives          = 
| website            = 
| module             = 
}}
Rochelle Eulah Eileen Humes (née Wiseman; born 21 March 1989) is an English singer and television presenter. Humes began her career in British pop groups S Club Juniors and The Saturdays, and has gone on to co-present the ITV entertainment series Ninja Warrior UK. Humes regularly guest-hosts This Morning, and since 2019, she has co-presented the BBC game show The Hit List alongside husband Marvin Humes.

Early life
Rochelle Eulah Eileen Wiseman was born in Barking, London, on 21 March 1989. She attended Frances Bardsley Academy for Girls in Hornchurch, Havering, as well as Colin's Performing Arts School. Her parents divorced when she was three years old, and she was raised by her mother, her step-fathers and her uncle Paul Ince. Humes is of Jamaican descent on her father's side, and English on her mother's.

Music career
2001–2005: S Club Juniors and S Club 8
S Club Juniors were formed in 2001 as part of a reality series, known as S Club Search. Subsequently, 19 Entertainment, the management company that had created S Club 7 and auditioned S Club Juniors, decided they should perform as a support act at all of the venues on the tour. By the end of the tour, S Club Juniors had amassed a following and, with the encouragement of 19, Polydor Records signed the group. Their first single was called "One Step Closer". The single was promoted by the television series S Club Junior: The Story and was released in the UK on 22 April 2002 in a chart battle with the Sugababes who released their comeback single the same day. A second single was named "Automatic High", filmed in Spain, while S Club 7 began their fourth TV series. Released on 22 July 2002, the single reached number two in the UK charts selling 52,000 copies, and spent eight weeks inside the UK top 75 and sold in excess of 110,000 copies in the UK. Their third single "New Direction" released on 7 October reached number two in the UK charts selling 55,000 copies in the first week. It became their third consecutive top ten hit, selling 130,000 copies in six weeks. The Juniors released their debut album Together on 21 October reaching number five in its first week of sale and selling 40,000 copies. Their fourth single, "Puppy Love/Sleigh Ride", was released on 9 December 2002. The single debuted at number six in the UK charts, and sold 85,000 copies in the UK, spending eight weeks inside the UK Top 40.

The Juniors began work on their second album in January 2003 and the band joined S Club on their S Club United tour in April 2003 where the announcement came of a name change to S Club 8 and an upbeat fifth single, "Fool No More". The single released on 30 June reached number four in the UK chart, selling 26,000 copies in its first week and overall 75,000 copies in the UK. A second single, "Sundown", was released in the UK on 29 September 2003 reaching number four in the UK and became their sixth and final top ten hit, selling 37,000 copies in its first week and 80,000 altogether. The album, Sundown, was released on 13 October 2003 to dismal reviews. It reached number 13 in the UK charts falling to 40 in the second week. It sold 60,000 copies in the UK and 315,859 worldwide. A sixth single, "Don't Tell Me You're Sorry", was released in the UK on 29 December 2003 and reached number 11 in the UK, becoming their first single to chart outside the top ten.

S Club 8 went on to I Dream for 19 Entertainment as they had already agreed to do it. Unlike the S Club 7 shows which focused upon the band's fictional exploits, I Dream saw S Club 8 as members of a larger ensemble cast. I Dream revolved around the summer school Avalon Heights, run by Professor Toone (played by Christopher Lloyd), where the characters tried to improve on their talents in the performing arts. The show featured many songs and dances: normally two songs per episode. S Club 8 split up in early 2005.

2005–2007: After S Club 8

Between 2005 and 2006, following the split of S Club 8, Humes presented the BBC children's TV programme Smile which was her first presenting role. The programme aired on Sunday mornings on BBC Two. Humes left the programme in 2006 for unknown reasons and the programme was axed soon after.

In late October 2006, Humes was part of a group called The TigerLilys, who had a MySpace page displaying two tracks. The group disbanded without being signed by a label or releasing any material commercially. In February 2007, Humes appeared briefly on Never Mind The Buzzcocks as part of the show's regular Identity Parade feature, where contestants guess which person out of a line-up of five was featured in an old music video played only to the audience and viewers. The team, consisting of Bill Bailey, Russell Howard and Romeo Stodart (from the band The Magic Numbers), correctly picked Humes from the line-up. On 22 October 2009, after finding fame again with The Saturdays, Humes returned to appear as a guest on Never Mind the Buzzcocks on Phill Jupitus' team.

2007–2014: The Saturdays

Since 2007, Humes has been a member of girl group The Saturdays, whose other members are Una Healy, Mollie King, Vanessa White, and fellow former S Club 8 member Frankie Bridge. The Saturdays made their chart debut in July 2008 with "If This Is Love", which reached the top ten in the United Kingdom. Its follow-up single "Up" was released in October 2008, and the song debuted at number-five on the UK Singles Chart; to date the single has sold 310,000 copies in the UK alone as well as staying in the charts for exclusive 30 weeks. The band's debut studio album, Chasing Lights (2008) reached the top ten on the UK Albums Chart and was awarded Platinum selling status by the British Phonographic Industry (BPI). The album also saw release from top ten singles on the UK Singles Chart—"Issues" and "Just Can't Get Enough". "Work" was the final single to be released from Chasing Lights. Wordshaker (2009) was the band's follow-up studio album and also charted within the top ten on the UK Albums Chart and went on to gain a Silver selling status, with singles "Forever Is Over" and "Ego" charting within the top ten on the UK Singles Chart. Headlines! (2010) was released as the band's first Mini album and charted at number-three on the UK Albums Chart and number-ten on the Irish Album Chart. Headlines! saw release of top ten singles "Missing You" and "Higher" which features guest vocals from Flo Rida, both singles became a massive commercial success for the band with "Higher" spending a massive 20 weeks on the chart. The Saturdays third studio album, On Your Radar (2011) contained three highly successful selling singles and two of which—"Notorious" and "All Fired Up" charted within the top ten on the UK Singles Chart. "My Heart Takes Over" was also released from On Your Radar.

The band released another extended play, Chasing The Saturdays which was only released in North America. The band's fourth studio album, Living for the Weekend saw the release of the singles; "30 Days", "What About Us", "Gentleman" and "Disco Love". "30 Days" became the group's eleventh top-ten hit, while "What About Us" featuring Sean Paul saw The Saturdays earn their first number-one single in 2013, it is taken from their forthcoming fourth studio album, Living for the Weekend. The album's fourth single, "Disco Love", became their thirteenth top 10 single, with Living for the Weekend becoming their fourth top 10 album.

Television and radio career
Humes began her TV presenting career by co-hosting children's morning TV show Smile from 2004 until 2006. In 2013, Humes was a regular panellist on the first series of Sweat the Small Stuff, then became a regular team captain from the second series.

In August 2013, Humes and her husband joined This Morning as regular stand-in presenters. They no longer appear together however since 2018, Humes has guest hosted the show alongside a co-star. Humes also appeared as a regular host on the show alongside Phillip Schofield for a short period between November and December 2018, filling in for Schofield's co-star Holly Willoughby during her stint on I'm a Celebrity...Get Me Out of Here!On 25 December 2013, Humes took part in the Strictly Come Dancing Christmas special. On 16 January 2014, she competed in The Great Sport Relief Bake Off. Since 2014, Humes has co-hosted segments of the BBC Children in Need telethon. On 3 January 2015, Humes and Alexander Armstrong co-hosted a one-off BBC One special called Frank Sinatra: Our Way.

In 2015, Humes began co-hosting Ninja Warrior UK for ITV, where she appears alongside Ben Shephard and Chris Kamara. On 18 June 2015, Humes was confirmed as a new co-host of The Xtra Factor, replacing Sarah-Jane Crawford. She hosted the twelfth series with her Sweat the Small Stuff co-star Melvin Odoom in 2015.

In 2016, Humes co-presented a new Sunday night entertainment series for ITV called The Next Great Magician alongside Stephen Mulhern. In 2017, she guest presented four episodes of Lorraine on ITV. In 2017, Humes sat in for Emma Willis on Sunday Morning Breakfast with Mulhern on multiple occasions on Heart London. In 2018, Humes took over Saturday early evenings (reformatted as Saturday drivetime) from Emma Bunton. At the end of 2019, Humes decided to take a break from her Heart FM commitments.

In 2017, Humes was announced to be voicing the role of a Voice Trumpet in the children's television series Teletubbies. On 20 November 2018, it was announced that Humes would co-host a music quiz show with husband Marvin Humes on BBC One called The Hit List.

Other projects
In June 2014, Humes unveiled her first clothing range for Very. As of March 2018, Humes began working with fashion retailer New Look. In February 2019, Humes published her first children's book, The Mega Magic Hair Swap. In February 2020, Humes launched her brand, My Little Coco.

In 2021, Humes published her first cookbook, At Mama's Table: Easy & Delicious Meals From My Family To Yours.

Personal life
Humes married JLS member Marvin Humes on 27 July 2012 at Blenheim Palace. The couple have two daughters; Alaia-Mai (born 20 May 2013) and Valentina Raine (born 10 March 2017), and one son; Blake Hampton (born 9 October 2020).

Discography

Filmography

Books
 The Mega Magic Hair Swap! (Bonnier, 2019) 
 The Mega Magic Teacher Swap! (Bonnier, 2020) 
 At Mama's Table (Ebury, 2021) 
 My Little Dragon'' (Penguin, 2022)

References

External links

 
 

1989 births
Living people
English child singers
British contemporary R&B singers
English women pop singers
English television presenters
21st-century Black British women singers
S Club 8 members
Singers from London
The Saturdays members
Participants in American reality television series
English people of Jamaican descent
People educated at Coopers' Company and Coborn School
Television personalities from London
Black British television personalities